Tamara Sušić (born 28 November 1990 in Čapljina, Bosnia and Herzegovina) is a Croatian volleyball player who turned to volleyball coaching. She was a member of strongest Croatian teams (National CUP and league winner ŽOK Rijeka, HAOK Mladost) and later international teams, including VC Pomi Casalmaggiore. She played for both the junior and senior Croatia women's national volleyball team. She remained active in volleyball as coach and organizer of Pro Volley camp.

Career 
She was part of the Croatian national team at the 2015 FIVB World Grand Prix, and at the 2015 European Games in Baku, Azerbaijan.

In 2013-2015 she played for CSM București winning CEV Challenge Cup. In 2015-2016 she played for VBC Pomì Casalmaggiore, at the 2016 FIVB Volleyball Women's Club World Championship winning silver. After the transfer to Poland she soon finished her player career due to accumulation of injuries and soon started working as a coach.

She lives and works in Rijeka, Croatia coaching volleyball club in Kostrena and leading Volleyball camp for Pro Volley with Tomislav Čosković.

Clubs

References

External links 
 ProVolley team

1990 births
Living people
Croatian women's volleyball players
Place of birth missing (living people)
Croatian expatriate sportspeople in Romania
Croatian expatriate sportspeople in Poland
Croatian expatriate volleyball players
Expatriate volleyball players in Romania
Expatriate volleyball players in Poland
Volleyball players at the 2015 European Games
European Games competitors for Croatia